Michael J. Kelly (November 9, 1902 – April 26, 1982) was a Major League Baseball pitcher who played for the Philadelphia Phillies in .

External links

1902 births
1982 deaths
Baseball players from Missouri
Major League Baseball pitchers
Philadelphia Phillies players
Bradenton Growers players